Ronald Gavril (born July 10, 1986) is a Romanian professional boxer. He is signed to Mayweather Promotions and is currently trained by Eddie Mustafa Muhammad.

Early life and education 
Ronald Gavril was born on 10 July 1986 in Bacău, Romania. He credits his two brothers for inspiring him to become a fighter. Although his brothers had been fighters for quite some time, Gavril only joined in 2002 the local boxing club SCM Bacău in his hometown.

Amateur career 
As an amateur, he gained a lot of experience as he fought 180 times losing only 15 of those fights. Ronald won in his career no less than ten national titles. Twice he won "Centura de Aur" (the Golden Belt), one of the oldest trophies in the world amateur boxing.

Gavril trained with the National Team of Romania eight-ten months out of the year. He represented his country in international tournaments such as worlds and European (three each). Ronald medalled in Cadet Worlds in 2003 and EU also later in his senior years. Amateur Record: 165-15

Professional career 
Gavril turned pro in 2011 at age 25 moving to Los Angeles from Romania, so he did not pursue his dream of representing his country in the London 2012 Olympics. Early on in his professional career he struggled to find a trainer. Gavril was also having trouble getting fights. In May 2012, Ronald decided to move to Las Vegas, Nevada, where he currently resides.

Floyd Mayweather and Mayweather Promotions CEO Leonard Ellerbe took notice to Ronald's skills during his sparring sessions at The Mayweather Boxing Club. Ronald Gavril signed with Mayweather Promotions in March 2013. Gavril won his first eleven fights before dropping a decision to veteran Elvin Ayala. Gavril bounced back by winning his next five bouts before facing Christopher Brooker for the NABF super middleweight title. Gavril stopped Brooker in the tenth and final round, having dropped him twice before that.

Anthony Dirrell was slated to fight David Benavidez for the vacant WBC super middleweight title in September 2017. However, on August 5, the WBC announced Dirrell was out due to injury. Instead, Benavidez would Gavril on September 8 for the vacant title. In a close fight, Benavidez defeated Gavril after 12 rounds by split decision (117-111, 116–111, 111–116). With the win, Benavidez became the youngest champion in super middleweight history at the age of 20. Benavidez seemed to struggle with conditioning and he was knocked down in the final round.

Benavidez vs. Gavril II 
Immediately after the first bout, rematch talks began. Gavril thought he won the first bout and disputed the decision. Benavidez's promoter Sampson Promotions confirmed on October 2, 2017, that negotiations had begun with Mayweather Promotions for a rematch to take place in January 2018. Benavidez stated he wanted to take the rematch to remove all doubt and set the record straight. The bout took place at the Mandalay Bay Events Center in Paradise, Nevada. Benavidez won via unanimous decision. The fight averaged 458,000 viewers.

Professional boxing record 

{|class="wikitable" style="text-align:center; font-size:95%"
|-
!
!Result
!Record
!Opponent
!Type
!Round, time
!Date
!Location
!Notes
|- align=center
|26
|Win
|23–3
|style="text-align:left;"| Khainell Wheeler
|
|
|
|style="text-align:left;"| 
|style="text-align:left;"|
|- align=center
|25
|Win
|22–3
|style="text-align:left;"| Jose Miguel Torres
|
|
|
|style="text-align:left;"| 
|style="text-align:left;"|
|- align=center
|24
|Win
|21–3
|style="text-align:left;"| Lisandro De Los Santos
|
|
|
|style="text-align:left;"| 
|style="text-align:left;"|
|- align=center
|23
|Win
|20–3
|style="text-align:left;"| Miguel Vazquez
|
|
|
|style="text-align:left;"| 
|style="text-align:left;"|
|- align=center
|22
|Win
|19–3
|style="text-align:left;"| Antowyan Aikens
|
|
|
|style="text-align:left;"| 
|style="text-align:left;"|
|- align=center
|21
|Loss
|18–3
|style="text-align:left;"| David Benavidez
|
|
|
|style="text-align:left;"| 
|style="text-align:left;"|
|- align=center
|20
|Loss
|18–2
|style="text-align:left;"| David Benavidez
|
|
|
|style="text-align:left;"| 
|style="text-align:left;"|
|- align=center
|19
|Win
|18–1
|align=left| Decarlo Pérez
|
|
|
|align=left|
| 
|- align=center
|18
|Win
|17–1
|align=left| Christopher Brooker
|
|
|
|align=left|
|align=left|
|- align=center
|17
|Win
|16–1
|align=left| Juan Camilo Novoa
|
|
|
|align=left|
|align=left|
|- align=center
|16
|Win
|15–1
|align=left| Mariano Hilario
|
|
|
|align=left|
|align=left|
|- align=center
|15
|Win
|14–1
|align=left| Scott Sigmon
|
|
|
|align=left|
|align=left|
|- align=center
|14
|Win
|13–1
|align=left| Jessie Nicklow
|
|
|
|align=left|
|align=left|
|- align=center
|13
|Win
|12–1
|align=left| Oscar Riojas
|
|
|
|align=left|
|align=left|
|- align=center
|12
|Lose
|11–1
|align=left| Elvin Ayala
|
|
|
|align=left|
|align=left|
|- align=center
|11
|Win
|11–0
|align=left| Jose Miguel Rodriguez Berrio
|
|
|
|align=left|
|align=left|
|- align=center
|10
|Win
|10–0
|align=left| Thomas Falowo
|
|
|
|align=left|
|align=left|
|- align=center
|9
|Win
|9–0
|align=left| Tyrell Hendrix
|
|
|
|align=left|
| 
|- align=center
|8
|Win
|8–0
|align=left| Cameron Allen
|
|
|
|align=left|
|align=left|
|- align=center
|7
|Win
|7–0
|align=left| Shujaa El Amin
|
|
|
|align=left| 
| 
|- align=center
|6
|Win
|6–0
|align=left| Dave Courchaine
|
|
|
|align=left|
|align=left|
|- align=center
|5
|Win
|5–0
|align=left| Jas Phipps
|
|
|
|align=left| 
|  
|- align=center
|4
|Win
|4–0
|align=left| Roberto Yong
|
|
|
|align=left| 
| 
|- align=center
|3
|Win
|3–0
|align=left| Kenneth Taylor Schmitz
|
| 
|
|align=left| 
| 
|- align=center
|2
|Win
|2–0
|align=left| Andrejs Loginovs	
|
|
|
|align=left| 
| 
|- align=center
|1
|Win
|1–0
|align=left| Gilbert Gastelum
|
|
|
|align=left|  
|align=left|

References

External links 
 
  
 Ronald Gavril on Mayweather Promotions

1986 births
Living people
Super-middleweight boxers
Middleweight boxers
Sportspeople from Bacău
Romanian male boxers
Romanian emigrants to the United States